Senator Stein may refer to:

Josh Stein (born 1966), North Carolina State Senate
Kathy Stein (born 1955), Kentucky State Senate
Katie Kratz Stine (born 1956), Kentucky State Senate